H.870 "Guidelines for safe listening devices/systems" (formerly F.SLD) is an ITU-T Recommendation, developed in collaboration with the World Health Organization. It specifies standards for safe listening to prevent hearing loss and was first approved in 2018. In March 2022, version 2 was approved and published. 


Apps 
In order to make the Guidelines available as widely as possible, the WHO released Android and iOS apps.

Toolkit 
In order to ensure widespread implementation of this standard, WHO, ITU-T and ITU-D’s Digital Inclusion Programme developed a Toolkit for Safe Listening Devices and Systems.

Inter-Agency Collaboration on Digital Health 
H.870 and the work on safe listening is part of the Inter-Agency Collaboration between the ITU and the World Health Organization on Digital health, which is undertaken primarily through ITU-T Study Group 16 and the ITU-WHO Focus Group on Artificial Intelligence for Health (FG-AI4H).

References 

ITU-T recommendations
ITU-T H Series Recommendations